The Lendl–Wilander rivalry was a tennis rivalry between Ivan Lendl and Mats Wilander. They met 22 times between 1982 and 1994, and Lendl leads their head-to-head 15–7.

The rivalry, with 5 Grand Slam finals contested, is tied for fourth most of any rivalry in the Tour. At the time of Wilander's 1988 US Open triumph, their 5 Major finals were the most between any two players.

Head-to-head

Singles (22)
Lendl 15 – Wilander 7

Breakdown of their rivalry
All matches: (22)  Lendl 15–7
All finals: Lendl 6–3 
Carpet courts: Lendl 4–0
Clay courts: Lendl 6–4
Grass courts: Wilander 1–0
Hard courts: Lendl 5–2
Davis Cup matches: Wilander 1–0
Grand Slam finals: Wilander 3–2
Grand Slam matches: Lendl 5–4
Year-End Championships finals: Lendl 1–0
Year-End Championships matches: Lendl 2–0

See also
List of tennis rivalries

References

External links
 ATP Lendl–Wilander head-to-head

Tennis rivalries